Peggy Shaw (born July 27, 1944)  is an actor, writer, and producer living in New York City. She is a founding member of the Split Britches and WOW Cafe Theatre, and is a recipient of several Obie Awards, including two for Best Actress for her performances in Dress Suits to Hire in 1988 and Menopausal Gentleman in 1999.

Early life and education
Born Margaret A. Shaw in Belmont, Massachusetts, she was raised in a working class Irish Congregationalist family with six siblings. When she was thirteen, she was a missionary in Costa Rica.

Shaw moved to New York in 1967. She had a child and was a social worker for the New York City Agency for Child Development.

In 1967, Shaw earned her Bachelor of Fine Arts in Painting and Printmaking at the Massachusetts College of Art.

Career
At the age of 31 after seeing Hot Peaches (a theater group in New York that consisted mostly of drag queens) perform in Sheridan Square, Shaw became involved with the company. Shaw began by painting sets for Hot Peaches and constructing paper mâché heads for a parade performance. Her first experience on stage was in 1975 on a gay tour of Europe. During this time, she saw Spiderwoman Theater in Amsterdam and met Lois Weaver. Shaw and Hot Peaches lived in London for 3 years, where they met Bette Bourne, who would go on to found the Bloolips after his experiences with Hot Peaches.

Shaw founded the troupe Split Britches with Deb Margolin and Lois Weaver in 1980. She also co-founded WOW Cafe Theater, an ongoing performance festival and venue.

Shaw suffered a stroke in 2011. Her show, RUFF, directed by longtime collaborator Lois Weaver, explores her experiences as a survivor.

The University of Michigan published A Menopausal Gentleman, a book that includes many of the scripts from Shaw's solo performances.

Shows
 The Slow Drag
 You're Just Like My Father
 To My Chagrin
 MUST: The Inside Story
 Dress Suits To Hire
 Belle Reprieve
 Menopausal Gentleman
 RUFF

Awards and grants 
Shaw has received Obie Awards for her performances in Dress Suits To Hire, and Menopausal Gentleman, and an ensemble award for her work in Belle Reprieve.
 1987: Village Voice OBIE Award for performance in Dress Suits to Hire 
 1990: Village Voice OBIE for the ensemble in Belle Reprieve 
 1994: Nominee for Cal/Arts Herb Alpert Award 
 1995: Anderson Foundation Stonewall Award for Sustained Excellence, Jane Chambers Award for the Best Play, Villager Award to Split Britches Company for Best Ensemble, Nominee for Cal/Arts Herb Alpert Award 
 1998: Out on the Edge Theatre Award for Sustained Achievement 
 1999: Village Voice OBIE for the production Menopausal Gentlemen, Nominee for Cal/Arts Herb Alpert Award 
 2004: The Foundation for Contemporary Arts Grants to Artists award.
 2005: The Foundation for Contemporary Performance, Theatre Performer of the Year 
 2006: Otto Award for Excellence in Political Theatre 
 2014: Doris Duke Artist Award for Theater

References

Further reading

External links
 
 
 Peggy Shaw on...women's roles

1944 births
Living people
American stage actresses
Lambda Literary Award for Drama winners
People from Belmont, Massachusetts
American lesbian actresses
20th-century American actresses
20th-century American dramatists and playwrights
20th-century American women writers
21st-century American actresses
21st-century American women writers
21st-century American dramatists and playwrights
American LGBT dramatists and playwrights
American women dramatists and playwrights